Parag Kumar Das (Assamese পৰাগ কুমাৰ দাস) was the former editor of Asomiya Pratidin, a radical journalist, human right activist and one of the founders of human rights movement in Assam.

Parag Kumar Das was also the founder leader of Manab Adhikar Sangram Samiti (MASS).

Prior to that Parag Kumar Das was the manager of Guwahati Stock Exchange.

Parag Kumar Das was assassinated by SULFA in 1996.

Das had his education in St. Stephen's College and Delhi School of Economics, Delhi.

Early life
Parag Kumar Das was born in Shillong on 24 February 1961. He did his lower primary, primary and high schooling from Chenikuthi Boys School, M.C.M.E. School and Cotton Collegiate Government H.S. School respectively. In 1977, he got the 4th position in HSLC examination. He also got 4th position in the Pre-university examination from Cotton College in Science stream. Then he moved to Delhi for higher education. He took admission in St. Stephen's College for his graduation in Economics. After that he joined the Delhi School of Economics at the University of Delhi for a master's degree.

In 1984, he joined as a manager in Punjab National Bank. After that he was appointed as general manager in Unit Trust and Guwahati Stock Exchange. In 1995 he quit from his job and joined as an editor in the Assamese daily Asomiya Pratidin.

He married Purabi Das and they have two children.

Journalism life
Parag Kumar Das started his journalism in Prantik and The Sentinel (an English daily published from Guwahati, Assam) in the late 80s. Later in, 1989, Das launched Boodhbar (English: Wednesday), an Assamese weekly. In 1994, he launched another Assamese magazine Agaan(English: Steps).

Both Boodhbar and Agaan were stopped following his arrests.
Finally, in 1995, he joined as the Executive Editor of Asomiya Pratidin, quitting his job from the Stock Exchange of Guwahati.

Books

Assassination
In the afternoon of 17 May 1996, while taking back his young son from school in Chandmari, Guwahati, Das was assassinated in broad daylight by four SULFA members - Mridul Phukan alias Samar Kakati, Diganta Baruah, Tapan Dutta alias Biswajit Saikia and Nayan Das alias Guli. His open murder created huge outrage in the entire state of Assam and the human rights circles of the country.

International Condemnation on Assassination
Several international human rights forums and journalist forums condemned the brutal killing of Parag Kumar Das. Amnesty International, on its note, stated, "...The killing of Parag Das highlights the suppression of human rights activity within Assam, where human rights violations and abuses have been committed with virtual impunity by both security forces and armed opposition groups."

Human Rights Watch stated, "...death of Assamese activist Parag Das in May exposed the security forces, use of irregular militias to carry out abuses..".

Trial & Judgement Controversy 
In 2001, CBI filed its chargesheet in Kamrup District and Sessions Court against the four accused - all members of the surrendered group of ULFA. Before the CBI filed its chargesheet, Diganta Baruah and Tapan Dutta were killed in 1998 and 1999, and in 2003 Nayan Das was hacked to death by a furious mob in Dibrugarh. Promod Gogoi and Prabin Sarma, two other suspects were not charge-sheeted for lack of evidence against them. Mridul Phukan is the only surviving accused in the case.  But after thirteen years, on 28 July 2009, Justice Dilip Kumar Mahanta, District and Sessions Judge, Kamrup, has acquitted the prime accused citing lack of solid evidence.

The acquittal of Mridul Phukan, the lone survivor of the accused in Parag Kumar Das killing, sparked criticism of judgement and investigation done by the Central Bureau of Investigation. Ajit Kumar Bhuyan, the then editor of Asomiya Pratidin, of which late Das was executive editor, said, "The judgment ( by the Kamrup Metro District and Sessions Court) has exposed the hollowness of our inquiry and law system".

MASS reactions
According to human rights activists, the key witnesses were not interviewed, some were intimidated, related materials were tempered to ensure the acquittal of the accused and cover up the state machinery's role in the case. Three of the accused were expired. The human rights activist, media, friends and family members of Das, all call it  as a betrayal of the CBI and the Court. MASS leader Lachit Bordoloi, expressing his disappointment with the verdict, said that the MASS would approach higher courts and continue the fight for justice to the slain activist.

Parag Kumar Das Memorial Trust
The Parag Kumar Das Memorial Trust was formed after his death by the family members and the well wishers. The trust has been organizing an annual debate competition at the state level since 1997. In 2021, the silver jubilee edition of the debate will be organized and from 2022 onward annual memorial lectures will replace the debate competition.

A documentary on Late Das sponsored by the trust was also released on 24 February 2018 on the occasion of his Birthday and is available in YouTube.

See also
Parag Kumar Das' Books in Amazon
Asomiya Pratidin
Manab Adhikar Sangram Samiti
List of journalists killed in Assam

References

1996 deaths
Journalists from Assam
Assassinated Indian journalists
Indian male journalists
Indian newspaper editors
People murdered in India
Indian murder victims
Indian human rights activists
St. Stephen's College, Delhi alumni
Delhi School of Economics alumni
Writers from Guwahati
1961 births
20th-century Indian journalists
Activists from Assam
1996 murders in India